The 1958 Oregon gubernatorial election took place on November 4, 1958. Republican nominee Mark Hatfield defeated Democratic incumbent Robert D. Holmes to win the election.

Candidates

Democratic
 Robert D. Holmes, incumbent Governor of Oregon

Republican
 Mark Hatfield, Oregon Secretary of State
 Sig Unander, Oregon State Treasurer

Election results

References

1958
Gubernatorial
Oregon
November 1958 events in the United States